Drew Denbaum (born December 12, 1949 in Brooklyn, New York) is an  American writer, actor, director, and educator, with credits in theater, film, and television.

Early life and career
Denbaum graduated cum laude with honors from The Lawrenceville School (1967) and Yale University (1971), where he was awarded the Saybrook Fellows' Prize  and was close friends with the author and critic, William A. Henry III, and the poet and psychologist, Steve Benson.

Theater
Denbaum's playwriting credits include Ways of Loving and Secrets, both based on stories by Brendan Gill and produced in New York City at West Park Theater and Stage 73. Denbaum's play, The Last of Wilhelm Reich was developed at Theatre Artists Workshop  after more than a decade of research on the controversial psychoanalyst, scientist, and social activist, Wilhelm Reich.

Denbaum's directing credits in the theater include Hatful of Rain by Michael V. Gazzo at the Samuel Beckett Theatre, The Poet and the Rent by David Mamet at the Henry Street Settlement Theatre, and Secrets at Stage 73, all in New York City. Notable theater performances by Denbaum include Marat in Marat/Sade by Peter Weiss, directed by Lynne Meadow; Uriah in Mann ist Mann by Bertolt Brecht, directed by Evangeline Morphos; Sir Andrew Aguecheek in Shakespeare's Twelfth Night, directed by Leland Starnes; Wilhelm Reich in The Last of Wilhelm Reich, directed by Denbaum; and August Strindberg in Strindberg's Dollhouse by Vivian Sorvall, directed by Mark Graham.

Film
Denbaum began his film career as a story analyst at Columbia Pictures and joined Cannon Films as assistant to the President in Charge of Production, Christopher C. Dewey. Denbaum was Associate Producer of the feature films, Jump!, directed by Joe Manduke, and Who Killed Mary What'sername?, directed by Ernest Pintoff.  While attending the Institute of Film and Television at New York University, Denbaum won First Prize in the 20th Century Fox Screenwriting Competition in 1975 for his original screenplay, Caught in the Act, about the Bay of Pigs invasion by the Central Intelligence Agency.  Denbaum's next screenplay was the science fiction dark comedy, The Sky is Falling, developed by director John G. Avildsen for Universal Pictures.

In 1983, Denbaum adapted and directed John Gardner's novel Nickel Mountain as a feature film, which was released by Warner Bros./Lorimar. His short films, Lovesick (starring Austin Pendleton) and The Last Straw (based on the play by Charles Dizenzo), were featured in the New York Museum of Modern Art's Cineprobe Series  and won awards in numerous film festivals, including the Silver Plaque at the Chicago Film Festival and the Grand Prize at the Virgin Islands International Film Festival.

Television
Denbaum wrote the scripts for two television movies, I-75 (CBS) and The Westport Women's Bank Heist & Frolic (NBC). As an actor, he appeared in Barnaby Jones as Stan Nesbit in the episode Dangerous Gambit and in Cannon as Bill in the episode The Quasar Kill. Denbaum also appeared on Saturday Night Live as the husband of Gilda Radner in the classic commercial spoof, Royal Deluxe II, which also featured Dan Aykroyd and Garrett Morris, and was written by Al Franken and Tom Davis.

Author
After decades of practicing Jain meditation, Denbaum co-authored the nonfiction book, Chi Fitness, with his wife, the dancer/choreographer, Sue S. Benton. Their book, influenced by the works of Moshé Feldenkrais, Gary Zukav, Carolyn Myss, and studies of the chakra energy system, was published by HarperCollins in 2001.

Educator
In 2007, Denbaum earned a Master of Teaching degree and Connecticut certification (English, Grades 7-12) from Sacred Heart University and began teaching high school students in English, Film Studies, and Dramatic Literature and Performance, heavily influenced by the progressive education theories of Ken Robinson and Native American Circle of Courage principles. In 2010, he began teaching Literature and Composition at Housatonic Community College, where he was elected to the College Senate in 2014. In 2017, Denbaum was named Director of the Stamford YMCA LEAD College and Career Readiness Summer Institute, an enrichment program for teenagers that includes classroom sessions at the Stamford campus of the University of Connecticut and briefings at corporate, cultural, and educational institutions, as well as trips to New York City and Washington, D.C. In keeping with his pedagogical focus on higher-order critical thinking, Denbaum expanded the LEAD After-School Program at Westhill High School by creating the first high school curriculum based on Thinking, Fast and Slow by the noted psychologist Daniel Kahneman, winner of the Nobel Prize in Economics. In 2019, Denbaum received the Stamford Public Education Foundation Spotlight Award for Excellence in Teaching.

References

External links
 Denbaum biography at The Dramatists Guild
 
 Denbaum biography at Theatre Artists Workshop 

1949 births
20th-century American dramatists and playwrights
20th-century American male actors
21st-century American educators
21st-century American non-fiction writers
American male dramatists and playwrights
American male screenwriters
American male stage actors
American male television actors
American television writers
American theatre directors
Film directors from New York City
Living people
Male actors from New York City
People from Brooklyn
Sacred Heart University alumni
Screenwriters from New York (state)
Yale University alumni
20th-century American male writers
20th-century American non-fiction writers
American male non-fiction writers
Educators from New York City
American male television writers
21st-century American male writers